Herne is a municipality in the province of Flemish Brabant, in Flanders, one of the three regions of Belgium. It is also situated in the region of the Pajottenland. The municipality comprises the towns of Herfelingen, Herne proper and Sint-Pieters-Kapelle. On January 1, 2006, Herne had a total population of 6,407. The total area is 44.63 km² which gives a population density of 144 inhabitants per km².

References

External links
 

Municipalities of Flemish Brabant